Congratulations: 50 Years of the Eurovision Song Contest was a television programme organised by the European Broadcasting Union (EBU) to commemorate the Eurovision Song Contest's fiftieth anniversary and to determine the contest's most popular entrant of its fifty years. Hosted by Katrina Leskanich and Renārs Kaupers, the event took place at Forum, in Copenhagen on 22 October 2005. The host was Danish broadcaster DR. Fourteen songs from the Contest's first half-century, chosen through an internet poll and by a jury, contested the event.

Thirty-one EBU-member countries broadcast the concert (although notably ,  and the  did not) and televoting and juries in these countries decided the winner. A total of 2.5 million votes were cast during the live broadcast. The event was won by Swedish group ABBA, who did not attend, with the song "Waterloo"; the band had originally won the Contest for Sweden in 1974.

To coincide with the event, the EBU released two double album CDs featuring Eurovision songs from the previous fifty years. Two DVDs with original Eurovision performances of these songs were also released.

Organisation
In November 2002, Jürgen Meier-Beer from the Reference Group of the EBU announced plans to organize a special jubilee programme in 2005 to celebrate the 50th anniversary of the Eurovision Song Contest. At the time no host broadcaster was announced, with German broadcaster Norddeutscher Rundfunk (NDR) and the Dutch broadcasting organization Nederlandse Omroep Stichting (NOS) reportedly as potential hosts.

Change of host broadcaster
In June 2004, the EBU announced that it was to hold a concert to celebrate fifty years of the contest. The event was to be held on 16 October 2005 at the Royal Albert Hall in London, England. The BBC was to be the host broadcaster for the concert. The Royal Albert Hall was reportedly unavailable, so in August 2004 the EBU announced that DR would stage the event instead. Eurovision Song Contest supervisor Svante Stockselius said that Denmark's previous experience of hosting Eurovision events (the 2001 Contest and the first Junior Eurovision Song Contest in 2003) were influential in the Union's choice. The event was codenamed Extravaganza.

1998 Eurovision winner Dana International, who appeared at the event, later went to suggest that the reason behind the change of host country was also due to the fact that the BBC wanted to present the show "with humour" as though to poke fun at the Contest, an idea that proved to be less popular with the EBU. The BBC ended up not broadcasting the show from Copenhagen, and went on to broadcast their own 50th anniversary program, Boom Bang-a-Bang: 50 Years of Eurovision, in May 2006.

Selection of venue and hosts

On 25 October 2004 Copenhagen was confirmed as the host city for the event, which was now scheduled to take place on 22 October 2005. In May 2005 Congratulations was confirmed as the official name of the concert. A month later DR announced that Forum Copenhagen would host the programme. The chosen venue had previously hosted the first edition of the Junior Eurovision Song Contest.

On 9 September 2005, DR announced that Katrina Leskanich and Renārs Kaupers would present the concert. Tickets for the event went on sale on 22 August 2005 from 10:00 (CET) and sold out in just over one hour. The event was attended by an audience of 6,000.

Participating songs
Fourteen songs competed in Congratulations. In May 2005 the EBU opened a poll on its website to decide ten songs that would contest the event. Voters chose their two favourite songs from each of five decades: 1956 to 1965, 1966 to 1975, 1976 to 1985, 1986 to 1995 and 1996 to 2005. The remaining four songs would be selected by the EBU's Reference Group.

On 16 June 2005 the fourteen chosen songs were announced, although no indication was given as to which had been chosen online and which by the Reference Group. Eleven of the fourteen songs were Eurovision winners; only "Nel blu, dipinto di blu", "Congratulations" and "Eres tú" (which all finished in the top three at the contest) were not. Johnny Logan, who won the contest twice for Ireland as a singer, had both of his songs featured on the list.

First round
All 31 countries broadcasting the contest voted in the first round. The five songs that are marked in orange qualified to the second and final round.

Second round
All 31 countries broadcasting the contest voted in the second round.

Scoreboard

Both juries and televoting were used at Congratulations; both having an equal influence over the vote. In the first round of voting, the number of songs was reduced to five. Each country awarded points from one to eight, then ten and finally twelve for their ten most popular songs. Unlike in the Contest proper, viewers were allowed to vote for songs which had represented their country. The top five songs were then subjected to another round of voting, where only six points and above were awarded. The voting was conducted in private, and the results were not announced until after the show. The song with the most points in the second round was the winner.

The full scoreboard is as follows:

First round

12 points 
Below is a summary of the maximum 12 points each country awarded in the first round:

Second round

12 points
Below is a summary of the maximum 12 points each country awarded in the second round:

Performances
The show started with the traditional Eurovision "Te Deum" theme followed by a message from Cliff Richard. After a quick montage of all 14 songs, the orchestra began playing "Ding-A-Dong" (Netherlands 1975), with dancers on stage. "A-Ba-Ni-Bi" (Israel 1978), "Le dernier qui a parlé..." (France 1991), and "Dschinghis Khan" (Germany 1979) was also played and accompanied by choreography, which was then followed by "Love Shine a Light" (UK 1997) sung by the co-host, Katrina Leskanich, who came out with flag holders of all the nations who ever participated in Eurovision.

Throughout the telecast, a number of highlights segments were presented which showed montages of various Eurovision performances which were either interesting, notable or unorthodox. There were 6 assortments, which were under the categories described by the hosts as 'past winners', 'political, daring, larger than life', 'cute men', 'unforgettable interpretation of dance', 'girlpower' and 'close/narrow second-place finishers'. A number of high-profile Eurovision artists returned to help introduce and present the show, these were: Carola Häggkvist, Massiel, Dana International, Birthe Wilke, Anne-Marie David, Sandra Kim, Elisabeth Andreassen, Hanne Krogh, Olsen Brothers, Emilija Kokić, Marie Myriam, Sertab Erener, Helena Paparizou, Nicole and Hugo, Cheryl Baker and Lys Assia. Cliff Richard and Nicole gave pre-recorded messages as they were unable to attend.

During the show, there were many presentations by various guest artists during the voting and tallying period. These consisted of the Finnish shouting choir Mieskuoro Huutajat, Riverdance (the 1994 interval act), Ronan Keating (the 1997 co-host), and Johnny Logan, singing his new single "When a Woman Loves a Man", as well as an appearance by the Belgian duo of 1973, Nicole and Hugo.

There were three medleys, consisting of performances of past Eurovision songs. The first consisted of : Dana International, singing "Parlez-vous Francais" (originally performed by Baccara for Luxembourg in Eurovision Song Contest 1978); Carola Haggkvist, singing "Främling" (1983, 3rd place); Alsou, singing "Solo" (2000, 2nd); Fabrizio Faniello, singing "Another Summer Night" (2001, 9th); Marie Myriam, singing "L'Amour est bleu" (originally performed by Vicky Leandros for Luxembourg in 1967); Richard Herrey, singing "Let Me Be the One" (originally performed by The Shadows for United Kingdom in 1975); and Thomas Thordarson, singing "Vi Maler Byen Rød" (originally performed by Birthe Kjær for Denmark in 1989).

The second consisted of: Gali Atari, singing "Hallelujah" (1979, winner); Bobbysocks!, singing "La Det Swinge" (1985, winner); Anne-Marie David, singing "Après Toi" (originally sung by Vicky Leandros for Luxembourg in 1972, winner); Lys Assia, singing "Refrain" (1956, winner), Sandra Kim singing "Non ho l'Eta" (originally sung by Gigliola Cinquetti for Italy in 1964, winner) and Bucks Fizz singing "Making your Mind Up" (1981, winner).

The final medley was sung by Eimear Quinn, Charlie McGettigan, Jakob Sveistrup and Linda Martin, the Eurovision winners of 1996, 1994 and 1992, and (in Sveistrup's case), the 2005 Danish representative. All four acted as backup singers during the show. They were also joined by the Olsen Brothers for a brief, Eurovision-themed version of their song "Walk Right Back".

Medleys

Opening Medley

  : "Ding-a-dong" by Teach-In
  : "A-Ba-Ni-Bi" by Izhar Cohen and the Alphabeta
  : "Le Dernier qui a parlé..." by Amina
  : "Dschinghis Khan" by Dschinghis Khan
  : "Love Shine a Light" by Katrina and the Waves

Winners of Eurovision

  : "Refrain" by Lys Assia
  : "Een beetje" by Teddy Scholten
  : "Dansevise" by Grethe and Jørgen Ingmann
  : "Merci, Chérie" by Udo Jürgens
  : "Vivo cantando" by Salomé
  : "All Kinds of Everything" by Dana
  : "Tu te reconnaîtras" by Anne-Marie David
  : "L'Oiseau et l'Enfant" by Marie Myriam
  : "Making Your Mind Up" by Bucks Fizz
  : "Diggi-Loo Diggi-Ley" by Herreys
  : "In Your Eyes" by Niamh Kavanagh
  : "Nocturne" by Secret Garden
  : "Take Me to Your Heaven" by Charlotte Nilsson
  : "I Wanna" by Marie N

Unforgettable performances

  : "Sámiid ædnan" by Sverre Kjelsberg and Mattis Hætta
  : "Making Your Mind Up" by Bucks Fizz
  : Host Lill Lindfors suffering a wardrobe malfunction live in the show.
  : "Wadde hadde dudde da?" by Stefan Raab
  : "Euro-Vision" by Telex
  : "Sameach" by PingPong
  : "Razom nas bahato" by GreenJolly
  : "I Wanna" by Marie N
  : "Samo ljubezen" by Sestre
  : "Minn hinsti dans" by Paul Oscar
  : "In My Dreams" by Wig Wam
  : "Pump-Pump" by Fredi and the Friends
  : "Baby, Baby" by Nicole and Hugo
  : "Wenn du da bist" by Marty Brem
  : "Shir Habatlanim" by Datner and Kushnir
  : "Brazil" by Bebi Dol
  : "When Spirits Are Calling My Name" by Roger Pontare
  : "Trödler und Co" by Peter, Sue and Marc, Pfuri, Gorps and Kniri
  : "Je suis un vrai garçon" by Nina Morato
  : "Guildo hat euch lieb!" by Guildo Horn
  : "Boonika bate doba" by Zdob și Zdub
  : "Weil der Mensch zählt" by Alf Poier
  : "Skibet skal sejle i nat" by Birthe Wilke and Gustav Winckler

Men in Eurovision

  : "Printemps, avril carillonne" by Jean-Paul Mauric
  : "Llámame" by Víctor Balaguer
  : "Jennifer Jennings" by Louis Neefs
  : "Stress" by Odd Børre
  : "Gwendolyne" by Julio Iglesias
  : "Varjoon – suojaan" by Fredi
  : "Jij en ik" by Bill van Dijk
  : "Ring-A-Ding Girl" by Ronnie Carroll
  : "Se piangi, se ridi" by Bobby Solo
  : "Natati La Khayay" by Poogy
  : "Baby, Baby" by Nicole and Hugo
  : "Fleur de liberté" by Jacques Hustin
  : "Chansons pour ceux qui s'aiment" by Jürgen Marcus
  : "Wohin, kleines Pony?" by Bob Martin
  : "Non so che darei" by Alan Sorrenti
  : "Come Back to Stay" by Dickie Rock
  : "Just nu!" by Tomas Ledin
  : "Der K und K Kalypso aus Wien" by Ferry Graf
  : "Kolybelnaya dlya vulkana" by Philipp Kirkorov
  : "Tænker altid på dig" by Bamses Venner
  : "Venedig im Regen" by Thomas Forstner
  : "Gleðibankinn" by ICY
  : "Singing This Song" by Renato

Dancing in Eurovision

  : "Heute Abend wollen wir tanzen geh'n" by Alice and Ellen Kessler
  : "Rendez-vous" by Pas de Deux
  : "Stop – mens legen er go'" by Ulla Pia
  : "Şarkım Sevgi Üstüne" by Seyyal Taner and Lokomotif
  : "Telegram" by Silver Convention
  : "One Step Further" by Bardo
  : "Boom Boom Boomerang" by Schmetterlinge
  : "Parlez-vous français ?" by Baccara
  : "Dschinghis Khan" by Dschinghis Khan
  : "Sonntag" by Mess
  : "Enséñame a cantar" by Micky
  : "Krøller eller ej" by Tommy Seebach and Debbie Cameron
  : "Baby, Baby" by Nicole and Hugo
  : "I'm Never Giving Up" by Sweet Dreams
  : "Kloden drejer" by Gry Johansen
  : "Bra vibrationer" by Kikki Danielsson
  : "Bem bom" by Doce
  : "Romeo" by Ketil Stokkan
  : "The Wages of Love" by Muriel Day
  : "S.A.G.A.P.O." by Michalis Rakintzis
  : "À chaque pas" by Jonatan Cerrada
  : "Džuli" by Daniel
  : "Only the Light" by Rikki
  : "Shake It" by Sakis Rouvas
  : "Fernando en Filippo" by Milly Scott

Women in Eurovision

  : "En gång i Stockholm" by Monica Zetterlund
  : "Estando contigo" by Conchita Bautista
  : "Bandido" by Azúcar Moreno
  : "Ein Lied kann eine Brücke sein" by Joy Fleming
  : "Vrede" by Ruth Jacott
  : "I anixi" by Sophia Vossou
  : "¿Quién maneja mi barca?" by Remedios Amaya
  : "Ooh Aah... Just a Little Bit" by Gina G
  : "Primadonna" by Alla Pugacheva
  : "Intet er nytt under solen" by Åse Kleveland
  : "Boum-Badaboum" by Minouche Barelli
  : "Desfolhada portuguesa" by Simone de Oliveira
  : "¡Qué bueno, qué bueno!" by Conchita Bautista
  : "Everything I Want" by Vesna Pisarović
  : "Never Let You Go" by Mando
  : "Baby, Baby" by Nicole and Hugo
  : "Mata Hari" by Anne-Karine Strøm
  : "Il doit faire beau là-bas" by Noëlle Cordier
  : "Rapsodia" by Mia Martini
  : "Marija Magdalena" by Doris Dragović
  : "Ele e ela" by Madalena Iglésias
  : "Un banc, un arbre, une rue" by Séverine
  : "'t Is genoeg" by Conny Vandenbos
  : "Voltarei" by Dora

Eurovision Favourites

  : "Parlez-vous français ?" (English version) by Baccara (performed by Dana International)
  : "Främling" by Carola
  : "Solo" by Alsou
  : "Another Summer Night" by Fabrizio Faniello
  : "L'amour est bleu" by Vicky Leandros
  : "Let Me Be the One" by The Shadows
  : "Vi maler byen rød" by Birthe Kjær

Eurovision Winners Medley

  : "Hallelujah" (English version) by Gali Atari (of Milk and Honey)
  : "La det swinge" by Bobbysocks!
  : "Après toi" by Anne-Marie David
  : "Refrain" by Lys Assia
  : "Non ho l'età" by Gigliola Cinquetti (performed by Sandra Kim)
  : "Making Your Mind Up" by Bucks Fizz (Cheryl Baker, Mike Nolan and Shelley Preston)

Second Places

  : "Un, deux, trois" by Catherine Ferry
  : "Beg, Steal or Borrow" by The New Seekers
  : "Are You Sure?" by The Allisons
  : "Su canción" by Betty Missiego
  : "Lass die Sonne in dein Herz" by Wind
  : "Le Dernier qui a parlé..." by Amina
  : "Johnny Blue" by Lena Valaitis
  : "Hora" by Avi Toledano
  : "T'en va pas" by Esther Ofarim
  : "Vuelve conmigo" by Anabel Conde
  : "Giorgio" by Lys Assia
  : "All Out of Luck" by Selma
  : "White and Black Blues" by Joëlle Ursull
  : "Nygammal vals" by Lill Lindfors and Svante Thuresson
  : "Never Ever Let You Go" by Rollo and King
  : "I evighet" by Elisabeth Andreassen

Medley "Backing vocals"

  : "The Voice" performed by Eimear Quinn
  : "Rock 'n' Roll Kids" performed by Charlie McGettigan and Jakob Sveistrup
  : "Talking to You" performed by Jakob Sveistrup
  : "Why Me?" performed by Linda Martin

Broadcasts 

A total of thirty-five countries broadcast the event, but only thirty-one participated in the voting.

Viewing figures

Non-participating countries 
Countries that have previously competed but were not involved with the broadcast or voting of the contest;

 
 
 
 
 
 
 
 
 
 

The BBC (UK), RAI (Italy) and France Télévisions chose not to broadcast the event. Søren Therkelsen, the commissioning editor of the event, said he was "disappointed" at the broadcasters' decision not to transmit the show. The BBC chose not to carry the event as it was "too remote" for British audiences.

Official album 

To coincide with the broadcast of the programme, an official compilation album for the 50th anniversary titled The Very Best of the Eurovision Song Contest (also known as Congratulations: 50 Years of the Eurovision Song Contest), was put together by the European Broadcasting Union and released by CMC International on 21 October 2005. The compilation featured over 100 songs, including all Eurovision Song Contest winners from 1956 until 2005 and a selection of all-time favourites, that was divided into 2 separate double CDs: 1956–1980 and 1981–2005. The 22-page booklet includes information about the entries, contestants and venues.

Notes

References

External links

2005 song contests
2005 in music
Television shows about the Eurovision Song Contest
Eurovision Song Contest 2005
2005 in Copenhagen
October 2005 events in Europe
Events in Copenhagen
Anniversaries
Nostalgia television shows